Columbus Africentric Early College is a public high school in Columbus, Ohio. It is a part of Columbus City Schools. The school's previous name, Mohawk Middle School, was changed in the late 1990s, to allow the school not only separation from its original status, but also to expand it into a large school. Africentric was moved into a newly built building near the John Glenn Airport in 2016.

The first organization that was started at Africentric was the Nubian Step Team. It was founded February 8, 1999 by Mama Eddings of Alpha Kappa Alpha sorority, Baba Hatton of Alpha Phi Alpha fraternity, and Baba Owens of Phi Beta Sigma fraternity.

Ohio High School Athletic Association State Championships
Girls Basketball - 2007, 2009, 2012, 2014, 2016, 2018, 2019, 2023

See also
Schools in Columbus, Ohio

References

External links
 School Website
 District Website

High schools in Columbus, Ohio
Public high schools in Ohio